The 1960 NCAA Men's Ice Hockey Tournament was the culmination of the 1959–60 NCAA men's ice hockey season, the 13th such tournament in NCAA history. It was held between March 17 and 19, 1960, and concluded with Denver defeating Michigan Tech 5–3. All games were played at the Boston Arena in Boston, Massachusetts.

This was the last tournament to include an independent school until 1988.

Qualifying teams
Four teams qualified for the tournament, two each from the eastern and western regions. The WCHA tournament co-champions received automatic bids into the tournament. The two at-large bids that were available to eastern teams were conferred to the winners of two separate playoff games between the four teams judged to be the best at the conclusion of the regular season. The games were played at the home venue of the higher seed. Neither of these games are considered to be part of the NCAA tournament but are included here for continuity.

Format
The higher-ranked eastern team was seeded as the top eastern team while the WCHA champion with the better conference record was given the top western seed. The second eastern seed was slotted to play the top western seed and vice versa. All games were played at the Boston Arena. All matches were Single-game eliminations with the semifinal winners advancing to the national championship game and the losers playing in a consolation game.

Bracket

Note: * denotes overtime period(s)

Semifinals

St. Lawrence vs. Michigan Tech

Denver vs. Boston University

Consolation Game

St. Lawrence vs. Boston University

National Championship

Denver vs. Michigan Tech

All-Tournament Team

First Team
G: Barry Urbanski* (Boston University)
D: Marty Howe (Denver)
D: George Konik (Denver)
F: Lou Angotti* (Michigan Tech)
F: Paul Coppo (Michigan Tech)
F: Bob Marquis* (Boston University)
* Most Outstanding Player(s)

Second Team
G: George Kirkwood (Denver)
D: Henry Akervall (Michigan Tech)
D: Pat Enright (Boston University)
F: Terry Slater (St. Lawrence)
F: John MacMillan (Denver)
F: John Kosiancic (Michigan Tech)

See also
 1960 WCHA Men's Ice Hockey Tournament

References

Tournament
NCAA Division I men's ice hockey tournament
NCAA Men's Ice Hockey Tournament
NCAA Men's Ice Hockey Tournament
1960s in Boston
Ice hockey competitions in Boston